
Kingston railway terminus was built in the Jamaica Georgian architectural style using brick. It was constructed on a grand scale, symbolising its importance as the main terminus of the Jamaica railways. It has prominent arcades on both levels of the east entrance end. Victorian cast iron brackets support the roof overhang on the trackside. It has sash windows on the ground and upper floors.

It was opened in 1845 and closed in 1992. It provided rail services to Montego Bay, Port Antonio, Ewarton and Frankfield. In addition to the station and its single platform there were extensive sidings, engine sheds, engine repair works, a roundhouse, a turntable, a traverser and a connection to the nearby railway piers.

One source claims it was "utterly destroyed" in the 1907 Kingston earthquake. However, in 2003 it was reported as being in "very good condition" and needing only "minor repairs".

It is on the list of designated National Heritage Sites in Jamaica.

See also
Railway stations in Jamaica

References

External links
Aerial view.
Photos:
Kingston railway station c1905.
Kingston railway station c2000.
Front and back of a used first class Kingston to Montego Bay passenger ticket of 1968.
Front and back of a used second class Kingston to Spanish Town passenger ticket of 1949.

Railway stations in Jamaica
Buildings and structures in Kingston, Jamaica
Railway stations opened in 1845
Railway stations closed in 1992
Brick buildings and structures

Railway stations in Jamaica opened in 1845